Turn Around may refer to:

Albums
 Turn It Around (Comeback Kid album)
 Turn Around (album), by Jonny Lang (2006)
 Turn Around, Look at Me (album), a studio album by The Vogues in 1968

Songs
 Turn Around (Collective Soul song)
 "Turn Around" (Dick and Dee Dee song), written by Malvina Reynolds, Alan Greene, and Harry Belafonte
 "Turn Around" (Enigma song)
 "Turn Around" (Samantha Jade song)
 "Turn Around" (Conor Maynard song)
 "Turn Around" (Phats & Small song)
 "Turn Around" (5, 4, 3, 2, 1), a 2010 song by Flo Rida
 "Turn Around", a song by the Beau Brummels from Bradley's Barn
 "Turn Around", a song by Devo, a B-side from the single "Whip It"
 "Turn Around", a song by Neil Diamond from Primitive
 "Turn Around", a song by Heatwave from Candles
 "Turn Around", a song by Billy Joel from Cold Spring Harbor
 "Turn Around", a song by Carl Perkins
 "Turn Around", a song by They Might Be Giants on the album Apollo 18
 "Turn Around", a song by Westlife from Turnaround
 Turn Around, Look at Me, a song written by Jerry Capehart and Glen Campbell, performed variously by Glen Campbell, The Lettermen, the Bee Gees, and The Vogues, and used in a 2019 Volkswagen commercial
 Total Eclipse of the Heart, a song written by Jim Steinman and recorded by Bonnie Tyler

Other
 Turn Around (film), a 2017 Taiwanese film

See also
 Turnaround (disambiguation)
 Turn It Around (disambiguation)